is a 2004 puzzle-platform game developed by Nintendo Software Technology and published by Nintendo for the Game Boy Advance. The game is the spiritual successor to Donkey Kong, which was released in 1994 for the Game Boy. The game's first sequel, Mario vs. Donkey Kong 2: March of the Minis, was released on September 25, 2006, for the Nintendo DS.

The game concept revolves around a combination of platform and puzzle elements, challenging Mario to find keys, reach a locked door, and rescue mini-Marios.

Gameplay

In Mario vs. Donkey Kong, the player assumes the role of Mario, who is pursuing Donkey Kong through a toy factory in order to retrieve several stolen Mini-Mario toys. The game, a puzzle platform game, plays similarly to the Game Boy Donkey Kong game, giving Mario a vast set of different athletic moves, including a handstand, a sideways somersault, and a triple jump, all of which can be used to maneuver platforming stages in various different ways. There are several different environments, ranging from a lava environment to the classic construction site, and there are five different types; in the first, and most common, Mario has to pick up a key and take it to the locked door, and then find and pick up the Mini-Mario toy at the end of the level. The second type is where Mario must guide six Mini-Mario toys to the Toy Box, while protecting them from dangerous environments. The third type is the boss level, where Mario must fight Donkey Kong in order to proceed to the next world. The fourth type is the Plus Level, where Mario must activate one Mini-Mario in the level, which is holding a key, and take it to the door. The Plus levels are overall designed to be more difficult than the main levels. The fifth type of level is the Expert levels. The Expert levels can be accessed after beating the main worlds, and after collecting enough stars in the main and Plus levels. In the Expert levels, Mario must get the key and lead it to the door, much like the main levels, but the Expert levels are the hardest levels in the game.  Getting through the door beats the level in Plus and Expert modes, rather than sending Mario to a second part.

Plot
Mario is the owner of Mario's Toy Company, a toy enterprise in which he sells a series of small wind up toys called "Mini-Marios". After seeing a television advertisement for the Mini-Marios, Donkey Kong immediately falls in love with the toys and sets out to the store to get one for himself, only to find that they are sold out. Furious, Donkey Kong breaks into Mario's toy factory across the street and steals all of the Mini-Marios, prompting Mario to chase after Donkey Kong to get his toys back. Mario travels in pursuit of Donkey Kong, rescuing the Mini-Marios and battling Donkey Kong several times along the way before retrieving all of the toys. Mario, the Mini-Marios, and the Toad employees from Mario's Toy Company all laugh at Donkey Kong, who has realized that all of his stolen toys are gone, prompting him to kidnap all of the Toads and imprison them on the tower of a big building. Mario climbs to the top of the tower, rescues the Toads, and battles Donkey Kong once more, after which Donkey Kong falls onto a truck containing a shipment of new Mini-Marios. Donkey Kong then promptly steals this set of toys as Mario pursues him once again to reclaim them. Following another cat-and-mouse chase, Mario gets back all but six of the captured Mini-Marios, which Donkey Kong holds captive and guards with a large robot mech. Mario fights Donkey Kong one last time, destroying Donkey Kong's mech and finally getting back the rest of the toys. Mario notices that Donkey Kong is devastated and crying in shame, to which he responds by comforting him and giving him a free Mini-Mario toy. After finally getting what he has wanted all along, Donkey Kong, Mario, the Toads, and the remaining Mini-Marios all rejoice together.

Development
The game is an evolution of Donkey Kong Plus, a title on display at E3 2002. During the show, Plus had a feature that allowed players to design and save their own levels on the GameCube, then copy them to the Game Boy Advance using a link cable. It was essentially an updated version of Donkey Kong '94, but the game had disappeared by the following year. It was replaced with the pre-rendered graphics and gameplay additions of Mario vs. Donkey Kong. The Create-a-Level feature was removed from this version (but appears in its sequel). The level editor still exists within the game's programming, and can be enabled through a modification.

The game has hidden e-Reader support. Nintendo held a competition in Japan in which cards were distributed to 1,000 winning participants. Five level cards were released by CoroCoro Comic, and another card was given away at the 20th World Hobby Fair. The game can save up to 12 extra levels.

Reception

Mario vs. Donkey Kong received "favorable" reviews according to video game review aggregator Metacritic. GameSpot named it the best Game Boy Advance game of May 2004. It received a runner-up position in GameSpots 2004 "Best Puzzle/Rhythm Game" award category across all platforms, losing to Katamari Damacy. On March 16, 2007, IGN listed it as #25 in their list of the top 25 Game boy Advance games of all time, calling it "a great game that fits the Game Boy Advance's pick-up-and-play environment since players could whip out the system, solve a puzzle, and put it away for later." The game sold 1.37 million copies worldwide.

Limited re-release
On July 28, 2011, Nintendo announced that Mario vs. Donkey Kong, as well as nine other Game Boy Advance games, would be available to Nintendo 3DS owners who purchased their systems before the August 11, 2011, price cut via Virtual Console as part of the ambassador program. This offer is available in all territories, and only to those who became eligible in the Ambassador program (by accessing the Nintendo eShop before the date of the price-cut). Although the game was released on December 16, 2011, to Ambassador users, Nintendo never released it to the general public in paid form on Nintendo 3DS unlike the Wii U version, which later released in 2017.

Notes

References

External links

 Mini Mario Toy Papercraft at IRP Papercraft

2004 video games
Mario vs. Donkey Kong
Donkey Kong platform games
Game Boy Advance games
Nintendo Software Technology games
Video games developed in the United States
Virtual Console games
Virtual Console games for Wii U
Virtual Console games for Nintendo 3DS
Single-player video games